Southern University Laboratory School (Southern Lab or SULAB or SULS) is a K-12 laboratory school in Baton Rouge, Louisiana, affiliated with Southern University.

History
It was established in 1922. The founding of a University-based school was the realization of Dr. J.S. Clark’s dream that a strong training school should be established to provide a training ground for Southern University students enrolled in the teacher preparation program. It countered the constraints of racial segregation in Louisiana and expanded employment opportunities for Southern University students majoring in education. Under racial segregation, Southern University students majoring in education were not allowed to gain practical teaching experience, as Student Teachers, in East Baton Rouge Parish. Practical teaching experience and passing the teaching examination were required to teach in any East Baton Rouge Parish school, black or white. 

The earliest school was called the Southern University Model Training School. In the early 1930s the name was changed to Southern University Demonstration School. A few years later, the school was renamed the Southern University Laboratory School. The Laboratory School was first accredited by the Southern Association of Colleges and Schools in 1936. From its beginning in 1922 until the present time, a major objective of the Laboratory School has been to participate in the preparation of teachers, while providing a good elementary and secondary education for college-bound students. 

Though semi-private, the school flourished as many of the Southern University educators and administrators as well African-Americans in Scotlandville and Baton Rouge enrolled their children to receive a top notch education. In comparison to public schools, the school was small in population. Typically, it had no more than 500 students from grades K-12. This provided a nurturing educational environment with a rich history of family culture and legacy. Many families sent all of their children to the school. 

The school's focus on academic excellence and its close relationship with the University allowed it to offer advanced studies, as well as a full range of extracurricular activities in academics, arts and music. In some instances, students were allowed to take university classes. The Laboratory School has graduated more than 5,000 students, a substantial number of whom have been trailblazers in their chosen professions. Its graduates are found in the ranks of doctors, dentists, psychologists, psychiatrists, lawyers, engineers, journalists, newscasters, artists, filmmakers, athletes, university administrators, military officers, entrepreneurs, educators, corporate executives, religious leaders and other professionals. 

In 2010 it had a low population count at 266 after a decline in enrollment, and the school had incurred debts. In August 2013 the school established the "Mini Lab" program in which university professors gave instructional sessions to the K-12 SULS students. By 2014 SULS campus enrollment had recovered and was now at fewer than 500.

In 2013 SULS started an online school; the intention was to have around 200 students. In 2014 the online program had 600 students with fewer than 400 on a waiting list.

Athletics
Southern University Lab athletics competes in the LHSAA.

Championships
Football championships
(10) State Championships: 1941, 1947, 1949, 1965, 1968, 1980, 1982, 1986, 1996, 2021

See also
 Southern University System

References

External links
 

Laboratory schools in the United States
Southern University
1922 establishments in Louisiana
Educational institutions established in 1922
Schools in Baton Rouge, Louisiana
Public elementary schools in Louisiana
Public middle schools in Louisiana
Public high schools in Louisiana